Little Asby is a small village in Cumbria, England. Historically part of Westmorland, its name is said to be derived from the Norse words askr, meaning "ash", and by, meaning "farm". A chapel at the site (St Leonard's Chapel), of which little remains, is the main reason that the village was built.

Just outside the village, to the west, is Little Asby Common, which is a Site of Special Scientific Interest and a Special Area of Conservation because of the plant species that inhabit the limestone pavement areas, as well as the limestone geology of the area. In chronostratigraphy, the British sub-stage of the Carboniferous period, the 'Asbian' derives its name from Little Asby Scar.

See also

Listed buildings in Asby, Eden

Sources

External links

 Little Asby Village website

Villages in Cumbria
Eden District